Arivumathi born Mathiazhagan is an Indian poet, lyricist and writer who has worked in the Tamil film industry. His first movie as lyricist was Siraichalai.

Early life 
Arivumathi was born in Virudhachalam, Tamil Nadu. He changed his name to Arivumathi combining his friends first name Arivazhagan as "Arivu" and his own first name "Mathi" together called as Arivumathi, he made this as paying respect to his friend who studied with him in his college. He studied Epigraphy and Archaeology in Chennai. Before turning into a lyricist he was working as assistant director to many legendary directors like Bharathiraja, Balu Mahendra and Bhagyaraj.

Career 
He began his career from poet Abdul Rahman from whom he learnt the art of writing Haiku poems.

He began his career in film industry as assistant director to Bhagyaraj working with him for four films. Later he joined Balu Mahendra as assistant director and worked with him for nine films. He introduced Bala a new face to Balu Mahendra to assist him and left to begin his new project as director. He was originally supposed to make his directorial debut with Ullen Ayya however the film was shelved. He joined again as assistant director to Bharathiraja and worked for films like Pudhu Nellu Pudhu Naathu and Kizhakku Cheemaiyile.Eventually he become dialogue writer and lyricist in his debut film Chiraisalai.

Filmography

Lyricist 
{| class="wikitable sortable"
!Year
!Film
!Song(s)
|-
|1996
|Siraichalai
|All Songs
|-
|rowspan="5" |1997
|Dhinamum Ennai Gavani
|Pathikichiyamma Pambara
|-
|Ullaasam
|Yaaro Yaaryaro
|-
|Devathai
|Deepangal Pesum & Oru Naal Antha
|-
|Bombay Kadhali
|Jeeva Natha Ennodu, Manmatha Malaranbu & Ullathil Thullidum Tamile
|-
|Raman Abdullah
|Muththamizhe Muththamizhe
|-
| rowspan="16" |1998
|Moovendhar
|Naan Vaanavillaiye Paarthen
|-
|Kaadhale Nimmadhi
|Indha Devathaikku & Kaalaiyil
|-
|Kizhakkum Merkkum
|Kathum Kuyile, Poongatre & Vayasupulla
|-
|Ponmanam
|Pattamboochi
|-
|Velai
|Kunnooru Poochadi
|-
|Ini Ellam Sugame
|Ae Poongatru
|-
|Kavalai Padathe Sagodhara
|Arule Arul
|-
|Iniyavale
|Uyire Uyire
|-
|Priyamudan
|Aakasavani
|-
|Poonthottam
|Iniya Malargal
|-
|En Uyir Nee Thaane
|Symphony
|-
|Desiya Geetham
|Desiya Geetham
|-
|Guru Paarvai
|Ding Dong & Paarvai Paarvai
|-
|Kannathal
|Pathilenge Solvai
|-
|Thalaimurai
|Enna Petha Raasa
|-
|Muradan
|Manjalil Kulitha, Nithamum Nithamum
|-
| rowspan="12" |1999
|Thodarum
|Sernthu Vaazhum
|-
|Chinna Raja
|Anbe Anbe
|-
|Endrendrum Kadhal
|Nadodi Nanba
|-
|Chinna Durai
|Maragathakutty, Unnaipola
|-
|Annan
|Aalamarathu Kuyile, Vayasu Pulla Vayasu Pulla
|-
|Periyanna
|Pacholay Keethukulla
|-
|Rajasthan
|Sorgathil Nikah
|-
|Malabar Police
|En Kannadi Thoppukkulle, En Kannadi Pesavillai
|-
|Anbulla Kadhalukku
|Manmatha Malaiye
|-
|Pudhu Kudithanam
|Adi Sammatham
|-
|Sethu
|Enge Sellum Intha, Vaarthai Thavari Vittai & Maalai En Vethanai
|-
|Manam Virumbuthe Unnai
|Ilavenirkala Panjami
|-
| rowspan="3" |2000
|Thenali
|Athini Sithini
|-
|Ilaiyavan
|En Idhayam
|-
|Kuberan
|Vaanam Vazhtha
|-
| rowspan="6" |2001
|Dhill
|Kannukulle and Oh Nanbane
|-
|Veettoda Mappillai
|Mannukketha Machane, Mapillaiyae
|-
|Piriyadha Varam Vendum
|Privondrai Santhithen
|-
|Alli Thandha Vaanam
|Kannale Miya Miya, Thom Thom, Anthi Karukkayile, Thattan Kedakkalaiyoo, Vaadi Vaadi Nattukkattai
|-
|Mr. Narathar
|Ullam Kavarum
|-
|Naan Paada Ninaipathellam
|Aathalinaal & Muthu Muthu|-
| rowspan="6" |2002
|Alli Arjuna|Onne Onne|-
|Kamarasu|Chinna Chinna Vilakke|-
|Karmegham|Etumula Veti Kati|-
|Run|Poi Solla Koodathu|-
|Namma Veetu Kalyanam|Ennadi Gnana Penn|-
|Bala|Poopoovai|-
| rowspan="12" |2003
|Dhool|Madurai Veeran & Kundu Kundu|-
|Anbu|Oththa Solluthan|-
|Thendral|Pathrakotta Mama|-
|Punnagai Poove|Eno Uyirmele & Siragaagi Ponathae|-
|Well Done|Kitchu Kitchu|-
|Parthiban Kanavu|Vaadi Machhiniyae|-
|Ice|Vaaname Enakke|-
|Aahaa Ethanai Azhagu|Kaadu Pathikichi|-
|Alaudin|Goyyaka|-
|Boys|Boom Boom|-
|Alai|Paiya Paiya|-
|Thirumalai|Azhagooril Poothvale|-
| rowspan="5" |2004
|Varnajalam|Pinju Mazhai Charal|-
|Udhaya|Udhaya Udhaya|-
|Sullan|Siragu Mulaitha|-
|Chatrapathy|Kaadhal Theviravathi|-
|Amma Appa Chellam|Pattam Poochi|-
|2005
|Ji|Kiliye Kiliye|-
| rowspan="2" |2010
|Mandhira Punnagai
|Satta Sada Sada, Enna Kuraiyo, Megam Vandhu Pogum & Siththan Mugam Ondru|-
|Magizhchi|Utchukotta Itchu Vachhu|-
| rowspan="5" |2011
|Siruthai|Thalattu|-
|Uyarthiru 420|Azhagiya Ravana|-
|Mudhal Idam|Inge Vaanthey,  Mudhal Idam, Thindaduren Naane, Uyya Uyya|-
|Vengayam|Ara Kirukkan, Megame Ven Megame|-
|Sadhurangam|Vizhiyum|-
| rowspan="3" |2012
| Soozhnilai| Kanne Nee Solladi, Vanthu Pogirai|-
|Ragalai| Unnai Paadam, Vada Vada Vellai Poove|-
|Ramcharan| Sydney Nagaram, Rooba Rooba|-
| rowspan="4" |2013
|Vathikuchi|Kanna Kanna|-
|Naiyaandi|Ae Le Le Etti Paarthale|-
|Ameerin Aadhi-Bhagavan|Kaatriley Nadanthene|-
|Annakodi|Pothi Vecha|-
|2014
|Arima Nambi|Neeye Neeye|-
|2017
|Kalavaadiya Pozhuthugal|Azhagazhage|-
|2018
|Sandakozhi 2|Sengarattan Paaraiyula|-
|2020
|Walter
|Mooche Analena Aache|-
|}

Television
 2003 Salanam 2003 RojaDialogue writerSiraichaalai'' (1996)

Other Works

Books 

 Mazhai Pechu
 Natpu Kalam
 Muthirai Kavithaigal
 Vali (Kavidhai Thoguppu)
 Thamizh Murugan
 Ayulin Anthivarai

Awards 
1999: Tamil Nadu State Film Award for Best Lyricist - Kizhakkum Merkkum

2011: Ananda Vikatan Cinema Awards for Best Lyricist - Sadhurangam

References 

Tamil film poets
Indian male poets
Indian lyricists
Poets from Tamil Nadu
21st-century Indian poets
21st-century Indian male writers
Tamil-language lyricists